UFC Fight Night: Bader vs. Nogueira 2 (also known as UFC Fight Night 100) was a mixed martial arts event produced by the Ultimate Fighting Championship held on November 19, 2016, at Ginásio do Ibirapuera in São Paulo, Brazil

Background
The event was initially expected to be headlined by a light heavyweight bout between former two-time UFC Light Heavyweight Championship challenger Alexander Gustafsson and Antônio Rogério Nogueira The promotion had previously scheduled the pairing as main event on two other occasions. First in April 2012 at UFC on Fuel TV: Gustafsson vs. Silva and again in March 2014 at UFC Fight Night: Gustafsson vs. Manuwa. In both instances Nogueira pulled out due to injury. However on September 30, Gustafsson pulled out of the bout citing an injury of his own. In turn, he was replaced by The Ultimate Fighter: Team Nogueira vs. Team Mir light heavyweight winner Ryan Bader. Bader defeated Nogueira in their previous encounter six years prior at UFC 119 by unanimous decision.

Michael Graves was scheduled to face Sérgio Moraes on the card. However, Graves was removed from the fight on October 3 after he was arrested on a misdemeanor battery charge. He was replaced by Zak Ottow.

Matheus Nicolau was expected to face Ulka Sasaki at the event. However, on November 3, Nicolau was pulled from the bout after USADA revealed a potential anti-doping violation from a sample taken October 13. In turn, Sasaki was pulled from the event entirely and was later rescheduled to face Wilson Reis on February 12, 2017 at UFC 208

Results

Bonus awards
The following fighters were awarded $50,000 bonuses:
Fight of the Night: Not awarded
Performance of the Night: Thomas Almeida, Cezar Ferreira, Gadzhimurad Antigulov and Pedro Munhoz

See also
List of UFC events
2016 in UFC

References

UFC Fight Night
2016 in mixed martial arts
Mixed martial arts in Brazil
Sport in São Paulo
2016 in Brazilian sport
November 2016 sports events in South America